Padham's Green is a hamlet in the Brentwood district, in the English county of Essex. It is near the town of Ingatestone. It is assumed to be a manorial name, deriving from the family of William de Perham.

References 

Hamlets in Essex
Borough of Brentwood